The 2014 Internationaux de Strasbourg was a professional tennis tournament played on clay courts. It was the 28th edition of the tournament and was part of the International-level tournament category of the 2014 WTA Tour. It took place in Strasbourg, France, on 19–24 May 2014.

Points and prize money

Point distribution

Prize money

Singles main draw entrants

Seeds 

 1 Rankings as of 12 May 2014

Other entrants 
The following players received wildcards into the singles main draw:
  Claire Feuerstein
  Pauline Parmentier
  Sloane Stephens

The following players received entry from the qualifying draw:
  Ashleigh Barty
  Olga Govortsova
  Mirjana Lučić-Baroni
  Silvia Soler Espinosa

Withdrawals 
Before the tournament
  Tsvetana Pironkova → replaced by  Kristina Mladenovic
  Laura Robson → replaced by  Stefanie Vögele
  Magdaléna Rybáriková → replaced by  Virginie Razzano
  Francesca Schiavone → replaced by  Sharon Fichman
  Zhang Shuai → replaced by  Zarina Diyas

Retirements
  Zarina Diyas (right hamstring strain)

Doubles main draw entrants

Seeds 

1 Rankings as of 12 May 2014

Other entrants 
The following pairs received wildcards into the doubles main draw:
  Claire Feuerstein /  Alizé Lim
  Tatjana Maria /  Paula Ormaechea

The following pair received entry as alternates:
  Demi Schuurs /  Eva Wacanno

Withdrawals 
During the tournament
  Anna Tatishvili (left ankle injury)

Champions

Singles 

  Monica Puig def.  Silvia Soler Espinosa 6–4, 6–3

Doubles 

  Ashleigh Barty /  Casey Dellacqua def.  Tatiana Búa /  Daniela Seguel 4–6, 7–5, [10–4]

External links 
 
 

2014 WTA Tour
2014
2014 in French tennis
May 2014 sports events in France